Bachelor Hall is a three story brick academic building on the Miami University campus in Oxford, Ohio, United States. It was built in 1978 and named after Miami University and Harvard University graduate Joseph M. Bachelor (1889—1947). It houses the Math and English departments, the Speech and Hearing Clinic and the Chair of Communications and Theatre.

History

Planning and Construction
In April 1977, the Board of Trustees voted to construct a $6 million communications building to be located at the southwest corner of Patterson Avenue and Route 73. During construction, the building at that time was called the Communications Building.

Post-opening
On November 4, 1979, Miami University held a dedication ceremony for Joseph M. Bachelor. The new communications building would be called Bachelor Hall in his honor and contributions to Miami. Students, staff and faculty came to the ceremony.

Joseph M. Bachelor

Joseph M. Bachelor was born in Sharonville, Ohio, on May 17, 1889. He graduated from Miami University in 1911, where he edited The Miami Student as an undergraduate. Bachelor earned a Master’s and a Doctor’s degree at Harvard University. After teaching English at Cornell College in Iowa, he returned to Miami University in 1927 as associate professor of English and head of Fisher Hall dormitory. In 1944, he was promoted to Professor of English, a title he earned by developing an innovative course titled Words and by his outstanding presentation of a Shakespeare course. Bachelor retired from Miami University in 1946 and died on December 12, 1947 at a Hamilton hospital. He left his farm, approximately 400 acres, to Miami University to be used for the Joseph M. Bachelor Wild Life and Game Preserve.

Complications
After Bachelor Hall was built in 1978, the university had to address some issues about traffic and pedestrian crossing. Bachelor Hall could alter traffic patterns. The university and the City of Oxford approved of two pedestrian cross walks at the intersection of Patterson Avenue and Spring Street. At the same time, they approved pedestrian traffic controllers to regulate traffic signals at the intersections.

Today
Bachelor Hall functions as classrooms, computer labs and offices for the disciplines of Journalism, Communication, English, speech pathology, audiology, Mathematics and statistics, and the Junior Scholars Program.

References 

Buildings and structures completed in 1978
Buildings and structures of Miami University